The Zande languages are half a dozen closely related languages of the Central African Republic, the Democratic Republic of the Congo, and South Sudan. The most populous language is Zande proper, with over a million speakers.

Languages
Per Boyd (1988), the structure of the family is as follows:
Barambo–Pambia: Barambu, Pambia, Ngala
Zande–Nzakara: Geme, Nzakara, Zande

Classification
Zande is traditionally included among the Ubangian languages, although Moñino (2010) does not group it within Ubangian. It is not clear if it is a member of the Niger–Congo family, or where it might be in that family.

References

External links
Zande materials from Raymond Boyd

 
Niger–Congo languages